Augusto Bernardino Leguía y Salcedo (February 19, 1863 – February 6, 1932) was a Peruvian politician who served as President of Peru from 1908 to 1912 and from 1919 to 1930, the latter term known as El Oncenio de Leguía (Leguía's Eleven-Year Rule) in Peru's republican history.

Early life
Augusto Leguía was born in Lambayeque in 1863, and later married into one of the most distinguished families of the Peruvian oligarchy. Educated in Valparaíso, Chile, he served in the Peruvian Army during the War of the Pacific (1879–1881).

After the war he moved to the United States and became an insurance executive with the New York Life Insurance Company. By the 1900s, Leguía had become very wealthy and decided to return to Peru. He entered politics in 1903 at the urging of Manuel Candamo (the then-leader of the Civilista Party) and also of José Pardo, who was Prime Minister. Leguía took the position of Minister of Finance, a post he would retain until 1904, when the former Prime Minister José Pardo became president. Pardo offered the position of Prime Minister to Leguía, who accepted and remained so until 1907, when he resigned to run for the presidency the following year.

First presidential term

In 1908 he succeeded José Pardo (a succession event that would occur again in 1919) after being elected president for the first time by an alliance of the Civil and Constitutional parties. Some of Leguía's first actions were to institute social and economic reforms in an attempt to industrialize Peru and turn it into a modern capitalist society.

On May 29, 1909, a group of citizens (supporters of Piérola's Democratic Party) managed to force their entry into the Palacio de Gobierno demanding the resignation of Leguía. Among the group were the brother and sons of Piérola; Carlos de Piérola, Isaías de Piérola and Amadeo de Piérola. Since Leguía did not resign as planned, they kidnapped him and took him in front of the Bolivar Monument (located in Plaza inquisicion in Lima). Once there, Leguía did not acquiesce to their demands, and the police had to forcibly rescue the president in the midst of a fight that caused at least 100 deaths.

During this period the country was also confronting boundary disputes with five of its neighbors.  Leguía succeeded in reaching agreements with two of them, Bolivia and Brazil. 
The Boundary with Brazil was settled with the signing of the Treaty of Velarde-Río Branco. This provided that two rivers (Yaravi and Yaverija) would compose most of the border for both countries.
With Bolivia, The Treaty of Polo-Bustamante determined the partition of the Lake Titicaca and provided a much more accurate definition of the Peruvian-Bolivian border. This treaty also delimited the borders with Tacna (which was until then in Chilean control).

When Leguía's term ended in 1912, he was succeeded by Guillermo Billinghurst, a millionaire businessman who had been the former mayor of Lima. During the following years, Leguía travelled in the United Kingdom and the United States, where he learned methods of banking and finance that he would later apply in Peru. During this time, Leguia was already in conflict with the Civilista Party and left its organization.

Second presidential term
In 1919, he again sought the presidency of Peru by trying to succeed José Pardo. Fearing that the former president's government along with the Civilist Parliament would not recognise his victory, he launched a successful military coup, which led Leguía to succeed Pardo as an interim president. He then proceeded to dissolve Congress and the new parliament elected him constitutional president of Peru.

Leguía changed the Peruvian constitution (which had the longest continuance since 1860), and promulgated a new one in 1920, which was more liberal than its predecessor and provided more civil guarantees and unlimited reelections. Nevertheless, having himself promulgated the constitution, Augusto B. Leguía almost completely ignored it.

The years of his tenure were marked with a dictatorial style of ruling by suppressing all opposition harshly.

Although he represented the Peruvian oligarchy, the oligarchs revolted against him when he came to power, and  it was his loyal supporters who installed him. Therefore he broke ties with the oligarchy, who protested his coup.

Various political opponents of his government were exiled, of which the most prominent was Víctor Raúl Haya de la Torre, who while in exile in Mexico founded the American Popular Revolutionary Alliance (APRA) in 1924. It became one of modern Peru's most active and controversial political parties. Another important political figure that would emerge during this era was José Carlos Mariátegui, leader of the Communist Party of Peru.

Among the positive initiatives that occurred during Leguía's second term was a program to modernize Lima by planning and starting public works through various loans. These included improving the health-care system by founding hospitals and building drainage systems around the cities. Peru's Government Palace ("Palacio de Gobierno") was also remodeled in 1926. Banks such as the Banco Central de Reserva del Perú and Banco Hipotecario of Peru were also created during his second presidency.

Treaties of limits with Colombia and Chile were also signed:
The boundary with Colombia was settled with the secession of all the lands between the Putumayo and Caquetá rivers. This was officially solved with the signing of the Treaty of Salomón-Lozano in 1922. (However, the treaty was published  after the overthrow of Leguía in 1930.)
The Tacna–Arica compromise was also signed with Chile, which unfortunately led to economic depression in later years. Leguía was bitterly criticized for accepting the compromise.

Overthrow

The Great Depression had drained foreign investment in Peru and after eleven years in power, Leguía's government was overthrown. The coup, on August 22, 1930, was led by Luis Miguel Sánchez Cerro in Arequipa. Leguía was arrested and charged with misappropriating government funds. He remained in confinement in the Panóptico of Lima, and died at a naval hospital on February 6, 1932.

Reception
Augusto B. Leguía is depicted as a tyrant in the 1937 novel Pity the Tyrant by American novelist Hans Otto Storm. American travel writer Richard Halliburton met Leguía during his Latin American travels chronicled in New World to Conquer. He describes Leguía as a charming and self-effacing "man of the people" who gives a humorous account of the 1908 coup attempt.

Notes

External links 

 

1863 births
1932 deaths
Leguía family
Peruvian people of Spanish descent
Presidents of Peru
Peruvian people of Basque descent
Leaders ousted by a coup
Prime Ministers of Peru
Peruvian Ministers of Economy and Finance
Civilista Party politicians
Recipients of the Order of the White Eagle (Poland)
Freemasons